Yesterday's Children were an American psychedelic rock band formed in Cheshire-Prospect, Connecticut, outside of New Haven, in 1966.  The group's earliest release was the psychedelic rock-influenced single "To Be or Not to Be". Though, at first, Yesterday's Children were a standard garage band, they transitioned into a psychedelic proto-heavy metal outfit that released one cult classic album before disbanding in 1970.

Trajectory 
Formed in 1966, Yesterday's Children featured brothers Denis (lead vocals) and Richard Croce (rhythm guitar), along with Reggie Wright (lead guitar), Ralph Muscatelli (drums), and Chuck Maher (bass guitar). The band took an aggressive garage rock musical stance, while incorporating aspects of psychedelic nuance into their compositions. Later in the year, the group released their debut single, "To Be or Not to Be", on the London Records subsidiary label, Parrot Records, and became a regional success. It is also one of the rarest and sought after releases by avid record collectors.

Over the following three years, Yesterday's Children released two additional singles. In 1970, the band recorded their only album, Yesterday's Children, which was released on Map City Records. It exemplified the group's development of a psychedelic proto-heavy metal sound, among the earliest of its kind. The album is marked by Croce's high-pitch screeching wails that prefigured those of former AC/DC vocalist Bon Scott, and the fuzz-toned double guitar instrumentals played by both Wright and Muscatelli. However, despite its innovative qualities, the album was perhaps released too early to be commercially accessible and failed to chart nationally. The group disbanded soon thereafter.

Reinterest in Yesterday's Children resulted in some tracks appearing on the History of Garage Bands in Connecticut compilation album in 1995. In 2004, Akarma Records released a remastered version of Yesterday's Children, which music critic Dean McFarlane described as a "stunning object to behold and an audiophile remaster of this underground classic". As a result of its distribution, the album has received more recognition for the early progressive music by Yesterday's Children. Another reflection of the album on the Sputnikmusic website boasts it is a "forgotten gem" and "Vanilla Fudge, Cream and the MC5 are often considered as three of the major influences on the future development of hard rock and metal. This obscure little band from Connecticut show, however, that these glory boys weren't the only ones trying to build upon their blues and psychedelic influences and attempt to deliver something distinctly harder edged".

Membership

Dennis Croce (lead vocals)
Richard Croce (rhythm guitar)
Reggie Wright (lead guitar)
Chuck Maher (bass guitar)
Ralph Muscatelli (drums)

Discography

"To Be or Not to Be" b/w "Baby I Want You" (Parrot 314, January 1967)
Yesterday's Children (Map City, August 1970)

References

Cheshire, Connecticut
American psychedelic rock music groups
American hard rock musical groups
American garage rock groups
Rock music groups from Connecticut
Musical groups established in 1966
Parrot Records artists